Wang Shih-hsien (born 11 February 1968) is a Taiwanese singer and actor.

Career 
As a singer, Wang won Best Taiwanese language performer at the 16th Golden Melody Awards. Wang has been nominated multiple times, including in 2008 and 2011, when he lost to Sodagreen and Huang Wen-hsing, respectively.

Wang starred in Niu Chen-zer's Monga and has also appeared in the television series The Unforgettable Memory, The Spirits of Love and Night Market Life.

Personal life 
Wang is married and has two children.

Discography

Filmography

Film

Television series

References

External links

1968 births
Living people
Taiwanese Buddhists
Taiwanese Hokkien pop singers
21st-century Taiwanese male actors
Taiwanese male television actors
Taiwanese male film actors
Musicians from New Taipei
21st-century Taiwanese  male singers
Male actors from New Taipei